The Best of Budgie was the fourth compilation album by Welsh rock band Budgie, released in 1997. The compilation contained tracks only from the third, fourth and fifth studio albums, much like the 1975 compilation of the same name.

Track listing

Personnel
Budgie
Burke Shelley - bass guitar, vocals (all tracks)
Tony Bourge - guitar (all tracks)
Ray Phillips - drums (tracks 1, 2 & 7)
Pete Boot - drums (tracks 4, 8 & 10)
Steve Williams - drums (tracks 3, 5, 6 & 9)

References

Budgie (band) compilation albums
1997 compilation albums